Khar Farih-e Olya (also Romanized as Khar Farīḩ-e ’Olya; also known as Ḩar Farīḩ-e ‘Olyā, Kharfareh-ye ’Olya, Kharfereh, Kharfereh-ye Bālā, Kharfereh-ye Dovvom, Kher Fereḩ-e Bālā, and Khorofray) is a village in Abdoliyeh-ye Sharqi Rural District, in the Central District of Ramshir County, Khuzestan Province, Iran. At the 2006 census, its population was 137, in 24 families.

References 

Populated places in Ramshir County